Eddie V. Freeman (born January 4, 1978) is a former NFL player and professional Canadian football defensive lineman.

NFL career
Freeman was drafted out of UAB in the second round of the 2002 NFL Draft by the Kansas City Chiefs and played for them for two years. He then signed with the Arizona Cardinals on September 8, 2004, and then the Jacksonville Jaguars on December 1, 2004. He signed with the Carolina Panthers on January 27, 2005, and then returned to the Chiefs on January 11, 2006, but moved on again to the New England Patriots as a free agent on July 31, 2006.

CFL career
Freeman signed as a free agent with the Calgary Stampeders on November 1, 2007, in time for the final game of the 2007 regular season. In the 2008 CFL season, Freeman played in all 18 regular season games and recorded 25 tackles and 3 quarterback sacks. The Stampeders went on to win the 96th Grey Cup championship against the Montreal Alouettes on November 23, 2008, and Freeman became a free agent on February 16, 2009.

References

Calgary Stampeders bio

Living people
1978 births
Sportspeople from Mobile, Alabama
Players of American football from Alabama
American football defensive ends
UAB Blazers football players
Kansas City Chiefs players
Jacksonville Jaguars players
American players of Canadian football
Canadian football defensive linemen
Calgary Stampeders players
Cologne Centurions (NFL Europe) players
Orlando Predators players